Marco Bonitta (born 5 September 1963) is an Italian professional volleyball coach. He currently serves as head coach for the Slovenia women's national team and Consar RCM Ravenna.

Career
Bonitta took over the Italian national volleyball team in March 2001. He led the team to a silver medal at the 2001 European Championship, and to their first World Champion title at the 2002 World Championship. He left his post in September 2006. 

In 2014, Bonitta once again became the head coach of Italy. He coached the team at the 2016 Summer Olympics held in Rio de Janeiro.

Honours
 CEV European Champions Cup
  1998–99 – with Foppapedretti Bergamo
  1999–00 – with Foppapedretti Bergamo

 National championships
 1997–98  Italian SuperCup, with Foppapedretti Bergamo
 1997–98  Italian Cup, with Foppapedretti Bergamo
 1997–98  Italian Championship, with Foppapedretti Bergamo
 1998–99  Italian SuperCup, with Foppapedretti Bergamo
 1998–99  Italian Championship, with Foppapedretti Bergamo
 1999–00  Italian SuperCup, with Foppapedretti Bergamo

 Youth national team
 2012  CEV U20 European Championship, with Italy

Individual awards
 2002:  Officer of the Order of Merit of the Italian Republic

References

External links
 
 Coach profile at LegaVolley.it 
 Coach profile at Volleybox.net

1963 births
Living people
Sportspeople from Ravenna
Italian volleyball coaches
Volleyball coaches of international teams
Recipients of the Order of Merit of the Italian Republic
Italian expatriate sportspeople in Poland
Italian expatriate sportspeople in Slovenia
AZS Olsztyn coaches